Revet (Räwät) is a rural locality (a village) in Inzersky Selsoviet, Beloretsky District, Bashkortostan, Russia. The population was 61 as of 2010. There are 7 streets.

Geography 
Revet is located 85 km northwest of Beloretsk (the district's administrative centre) by road. Inzer is the nearest rural locality.

References 

Rural localities in Beloretsky District